Mantophasma is a genus of insects in the family Mantophasmatidae. It contains 4 species, all of which are endemic to Namibia.

Species
These species belong to the genus Mantophasma:

 Mantophasma gamsbergense Zompro & Adis, 2006
 Mantophasma kudubergense Zompro & Adis, 2006
 Mantophasma omatakoense Zompro & Adis, 2006
 Mantophasma zephyra Zompro, Klass, Kristensen, & Adis 2002

References

Mantophasmatidae
Insects of Namibia
Endemic fauna of Namibia